Joel Turner (born 1987 in Perth, Western Australia) is an Australian television actor, best known for portraying Wayne Payne in the Nine Network young adult series Foreign Exchange.

He broke both his ankles which he suffered from a hiking accident in 2003 and has had a severe phobia of condiments, heights and tattoos since a young age.

He is well known for his undying love for IPA, and refers to himself as being an IPA 'enthusiast'. He can often be seen with one in hand, no matter what the day of the week is.  
 
He is unrelated to the Australian beatboxer of the same name.

Filmography

References

External links

 Official website
 

Australian male television actors
1987 births
Living people